Grégoire Joseph Dupont (December 18, 1842 – July 1, 1917) was a Belgian-American politician. He served in the Wisconsin State Assembly in 1887, representing Brown County's first district.

Biography
Dupont was born in Belgium in 1842, and immigrated to Wisconsin in 1855. He married fellow Belgian Julie Henrion at Bay Settlement, Wisconsin in 1862, and they had nine children together. At various points in his life, Dupont was occupied as a shingle mill laborer, photographer and farmer. He lived in Robinsonville, Wisconsin.

Dupont was a member of the 18th Wisconsin Infantry in the American Civil War. He served in the Wisconsin State Assembly in 1887 as the representative for northeastern Brown County. Dupont was one of the first Belgian-Americans from northeast Wisconsin to serve in the Assembly; others included Joseph Wery, Constant Martin, Benjamin Fontaine and John B. Eugene. Dupont was also a school board member, the town chairman for Green Bay, a Brown County supervisor for the town of Green Bay and a member of the Green Bay Dairy Board of Trade. He held the town supervisor position for 28 years.

Dupont died on July 1, 1917 and was buried in Robinsonville.

Electoral history

| colspan="6" style="text-align:center;background-color: #e9e9e9;"| General Election

References

1842 births
1917 deaths
Republican Party members of the Wisconsin State Assembly
People from Brown County, Wisconsin
Belgian emigrants to the United States
19th-century American politicians